Nezma Khatun is a member of 2nd Nepalese Constituent Assembly. She won Bara–4 seat in CA assembly, 2013 from Communist Party of Nepal (Unified Marxist–Leninist).

References

Living people
Year of birth missing (living people)
Communist Party of Nepal (Unified Marxist–Leninist) politicians
21st-century Nepalese women politicians
21st-century Nepalese politicians
Members of the 2nd Nepalese Constituent Assembly